Rafael Nadal defeated John Isner in the final, 7–6(10–8), 7–6(7–3) to win the men's singles tennis title at the 2013 Cincinnati Open. It was his record-extending 26th Masters title.

Roger Federer was the defending champion, but lost in the quarterfinals to Nadal.

Seeds
The top eight seeds receive a bye into the second round.

Draw

Finals

Top half

Section 1

Section 2

Bottom half

Section 3

Section 4

Qualifying

Seeds

Qualifiers

Qualifying draw

First qualifier

Second qualifier

Third qualifier

Fourth qualifier

Fifth qualifier

Sixth qualifier

Seventh qualifier

References
Main Draw
Qualifying Draw

Western and Southern Open
Singles men